Nancy is a ghost town in Angelina County, in the U.S. state of Texas. It is located within the Lufkin, Texas micropolitan area.

History
Nancy was founded by the Angelina County Lumber Company sometime before 1923 in an area consisting mostly of longleaf pine trees. It made harvesting several areas of the company's virgin pine stands in the area between Zavalla and Manning easier. It was originally named Dunkin but was changed to Nancy in honor of local lumberjack Charles A. Kelty's wife, who was also the daughter of the company's secretary/treasurer Dave Thompson. 

A post office was established at Nancy in 1901 and remained in operation until 1941 when the post office in Zavalla delivered mail to the town. Harrison A. Dunkin was the first postmaster and several others followed suit until its closure. The Angelina County Lumber Company then moved its lumber camp to Nancy from Nacogdoches County on the Texas and New Orleans Railroad and established a commissary, tenant houses and boxcar houses. 

When the amount of wood ran out in October 1933, the camp was moved to Tyler County. This resulted in the decline of the Nancy community but was still classified as a "dispersed, rural community" in the 1980s. Its population was less than 100 in 1904 but was too small to be listed by the Texas Almanac in 1929. It had six businesses and 250 residents in 1936, which went down to one business and 80 residents in 1940. The community was chosen to be the location of the Angelina County Lumber Company Camp during its time because new technology and the openness of the woods caused it to change its method of logging; thus, it became one of the largest lumber companies in Southeast Texas. They originally had teams of oxen and mules that were then replaced by the four-line rehaul skidder, which was used to draw logs from the forest to trains by a cable. They would bring up to 800 logs each day while using two lines. They would also cover  of board on each side of the railroad tracks so that they could easily be placed on trolleys. This caused the benefit of using it in Southeast Texas forests.

On November 13, 1972, an F2 tornado hit Nancy, killing two people.

Geography

Education
Nancy once had its own school. Today, the ghost town is located within the Zavalla Independent School District.

See also
List of ghost towns in Texas

References

Geography of Angelina County, Texas
Ghost towns in East Texas